Line 700 is one of CFR's main lines in Romania having a total length of . The main line, connecting Bucharest with the Moldovan border at Giurgiulești, passes through the important cities of Urziceni, Făurei, Brăila and Galați.

Secondary lines

References

Railway lines in Romania
Standard gauge railways in Romania